Ancylosis biflexella is a species of snout moth in the genus Ancylosis. It was described by Julius Lederer in 1855, and is known from Niger, Tunisia, Algeria, Israel, Lebanon, Iran, Cyprus and the Canary Islands.

References

Moths described in 1855
biflexella
Moths of Africa
Moths of Asia